Derrick Ndzimande is a South African gospel musician popular in the Pentecostal church movements of the early 1980s and early 1990s. He sings with a deep falsetto baritone voice. He is also a pastor at the Church of Jesus Christ, music producer and a former teacher at Blomplaas Primary School. He is best known for his albums "Nangu Jesu" and "The Power(Amanda) ". He is married to Martha Ndinisa and they have a son, Surprise. Lives in Belfast.

Dr Derrick was born on 30 March 1954 on Vermont Farm, Lydenburg, Mpumalanga, SA. Later, the family moved to Belfast in 1966. The only son and six sisters from his parents, Martha and Abram Ndzimande. 
He completed SSA-STD 2 on the very same farm. In 1967 - 1970 completed STD 3 - STD 6 at Belfast Primary School.In 1973 Dr Derrick passed STD 9(JC) at Mayisha High School. He studied privately and passed his STD 10 (matric) in 1983. 
In 1974 and 1975, Dr Derrick started teaching privately while being an acting principal at Blomplaas Primary School in Belfast - a primary school which he started from the ground. 
1976 - 1977: Trained as a teacher (PTC) at Mgwenya College of Education in Nelspruit, Mpumalanga 
1978: Returned to Blomplaas Primary as the Principal. 
Dr Derrick enrolled with UNISA for music lessons where he obtained his Grade 1 in Theory of Music and his Grade 2 from Trinity College of Music, London, UK. 
1983: Alfred Sambo from Ligwalagwala FM introduced Dr Derrick to his first studio session. 
1984: Dr Derrick released his debut album “Nang uJesu” under Reamusic Record Company which was later absorbed by Sony Music in 1998. 
On 4 July 1987, he married Martha Ndinisa. 
Dr Derrick established his own record label - Derrick’s Production - and Recording Studio in Belfast, Mpumalanga. Through this, Dr Derrick has introduced multiple groups such as: MASIBUYELE KUJEHOVA, MRS NOMAKHOLWA, ANDY and THE HIGHGOERS, NkILIJI AEC. 
1995: Dr Derrick transitioned into the music industry fulltime and thus leaving the teaching profession. 
2008: Dr Derrick released his last album titled “UBUSISIWE”. This led to the closure of Derrick’s Production - however, he still performs and the group is still in tact. 
(Currently at 26 Albums with 20 Gold Discs and 10 Platinum Discs achieved. 
1 
Between 2010 and 2014, Dr Derrick was invited to the UK by Calvary Apostolic Assembly, BIC church and UK based Gospel Artist, Mthulisi Dube as well as many other churches. Performances and Preachings took place in London, Basildon, Birmingham, Manchester, Bolton, Leeds, Wales, Bristol, Coventry, Luton and Swindon. Pastor Derrick also ministered in African Countries such as Zambia, Malawi, Botswana Zimbabwe, DRC, Lesotho, and Swaziland to name a few.

1973: Became Born again Christian- Dr Derrick considers this as the biggest and greatest award of them all. 
1990: Gospel Singer of the Month April - Masimdumise (Religious TV Show). 
1996: Premier’s Award from Mpumalanga’s Premier Matthew Phosa in acknowledgement of sterling contribution support and promotion in the National Area. 
2000: Awarded an Honorary Doctorate Degree in Theology by The South African Bible Institute in conjunction with the Zion Christian University of USA. This is in honor of the impact Dr Derrick’s music on thousands of people. 
2008: Honored as a South African Gospel Music Pioneer by the SABC Crown Gospel Music Awards. 
2013: Awarded with a Lifetime Achievement Award by GNF TV. 
2014: Awarded with a Lifetime Achievement Award by Mpumalanga Gospel Music Awards. 
2015: Awarded for his contribution to Gospel Music by Arise and Rebuild International Ministries. 
2017: Received an Injongo Lifetime Achiever Award by Temple of Faith Fellowship Centre. 
2018 (May): Invited as a guest performing artist at USIBA Creative & Cultural Industries Awards at Empororer’s Palace in Johannesburg. 
2018 (July): Travelled to Israel (via Egypt) with members of The Church of Jesus Christ. 
2018: Awarded with a Lifetime Achievement Award by Mpumakoloni International Gospel Music Awards (MKIGMA). 
2019: Dr Derrick received a Special Award from the Mpumalanga MEC, Mr Sibusiso Malaza, for the role he played in Education as an educator and principal, 
2019:Dr Derrick was also honored as a Gospel Music Legend by Ngonyama Music in Johannesburg. 
In their marriage they were blessed with two children : Gladness and Surprise.

References

Year of birth missing (living people)
Living people
South African musicians